This is a list of Telugu-language films produced in the year 1974.

References

Telugu
1974
1974 in Indian cinema